This article contains information about the literary events and publications of 1668.

Events
c. February – The English Parliament and bishops seek to suppress Thomas Hobbes' treatise Leviathan.
September 9 – Molière's comedy The Miser (L'Avare) is first performed, at the Théâtre du Palais-Royal (rue Saint-Honoré) in Paris.
unknown date – Izaak Walton's The Compleat Angler goes into its fourth edition.

New books

Prose
Juan Caramuel – Primus calamus
Meric Casaubon – Of Credulity and Incredulity
Josiah Child – Brief Observations concerning Trade and the Interest of Money
Jean Claude – Réponse au livre de P. Nouet sur l'eucharistie
Jan Comenius – The Way of Light
John Dryden – Essay of Dramatick Poesie
Richard Duckworth and Fabian Stedman –  Tintinnalogia, or, the Art of Ringing
Richard Flecknoe – Sir William Davenant's Voyage to the Other World
Hans Jakob Christoffel von Grimmelshausen – Simplicius Simplicissimus (first picaresque novel in German, dated 1669 but probably published this year)
Johannes Hevelius – Cometographia
Peter Heylin – Cyprianus Anglicanus (biography of William Laud)
Urban Hjärne – Stratonice (completed)
Adriaan Koerbagh – Een Bloemhof
Henry Neville – The Isle of Pines
William Penn – Truth Exalted
Francisco Santos – Periquillo el de las gallineras
John Wilkins – An Essay towards a Real Character and a Philosophical Language

Drama
Roger Boyle, 1st Earl of Orrery 
Tryphon (performed)
Henry V (published)
Mustapha (published)
Margaret Cavendish – Plays, Never Before Printed, Written by the Thrice Noble, Illustrious, and Excellent Princess, the Duchess of Newcastle (closet dramas)
Sir William Davenant – The Man's the Master (a translation of Paul Scarron's Jodelet, ou le maître valet)
John Dryden – An Evening's Love
George Etherege – She Would If She Could
Sir Robert Howard – The Great Favourite or the Duke of Lerma
Molière 
L'Avare (The Miser)
George Dandin ou le Mari confondu
Sir Charles Sedley – The Mulberry-Garden
Thomas Shadwell – The Sullen Lovers

Poetry
Abraham Cowley – Poemata Latina (posthumous)
Sir John Denham – Poems and Translations
Jean de La Fontaine – Fables choisies, mises en vers
Georg Stiernhielm – Musæ Suethizantes

Births
May 8 – Alain-René Lesage, French novelist and playwright (died 1747)
 September – Joseph Bingham, scholar (died 1723)
 November (baptised) – Thomas Woolston, deist writer (died 1731)
November 11 – Johann Albert Fabricius (died 1736)
December 21 – Herman Boerhaave, humanist (died 1738)

Deaths
April 7 – Sir William Davenant, poet and playwright (born 1606)
May 21 – Josephus Adjutus, theologian (born c. 1602)
August 9 – Jakob Balde, Latinist poet and academic (born 1604)
November 17 – Joseph Alleine, Nonconformist writer (born 1634)
December 11 – Marquise-Thérèse de Gorla, actress (born 1633)
December 22 – Stephen Daye, first American printer (born 1594)
December 23 – Martin Baučer, Slovene historian (born 1595)

References

 
Years of the 17th century in literature